Charles Rice (1840 - 9 September 1895) was a Russian-born fireman, second class (E-2 rank) of the United States Navy who was awarded the Medal of Honor for gallantry during the American Civil War. On 23 December 1864, Rice was part of a volunteer crew that guided and exploded a powder boat near Fort Fisher in North Carolina. The raid was successful, setting the fort ablaze for at least one day.

Personal life 
Rice was born in Russia in 1840. Not much is known about his early life before his enlistment in the U.S. Navy at Portland, Maine. Rice died on 9 September 1895 in Westbrook, Cumberland County, Maine. It is unknown where he is buried.

Military service 
In the navy, Rice was a coal heaver and attained the rank of fireman, second class (E-2). He served on the USS Agawam. On the date he won the Medal of Honor, he volunteered to join a crew attempting to detonate a powder boat pulled by the  near the Confederate-controlled Fort Fisher.

Rice's Medal of Honor citation reads:

References 

United States Navy Medal of Honor recipients
American Civil War recipients of the Medal of Honor
1840 births
1895 deaths